USS Blue Ridge may refer to the following ships of the United States Navy:

 , was originally constructed as the Great Lakes passenger steamer Virginia and was in service for less than a year during 1918
 , was an amphibious force flagship, and served from 1943 to 1947
 , is a command and control ship, serving as the Seventh Fleet command ship

United States Navy ship names